"Run to the Hills" is a song by the English heavy metal band Iron Maiden. It was released as their sixth single and the first from the band's third studio album, The Number of the Beast (1982). It is their first single with Bruce Dickinson as vocalist. Credited solely to the band's bassist, Steve Harris, Dickinson contributed to the song but could not be credited due to a contractual agreement with his former band Samson. Run to the Hills remains one of the band's most popular songs, with VH1 ranking it No. 27 on their list of the 40 Greatest Metal Songs and No. 14 on their list of the Greatest Hard Rock Songs.

A live version of the song, from Live After Death, was released in 1985 and the original single was reissued in 2002, with all income donated to former drummer Clive Burr's MS Trust Fund. In 1990, as part of The First Ten Years box set, both the original and the 1985 live single were reissued on CD and 12" vinyl, combined with "The Number of the Beast" and "Running Free (live)" respectively.

Composition
Due to contractual issues with his previous band, Samson, Dickinson could not be credited for any of his contributions made during the writing of The Number of the Beast. Although bassist Steve Harris alone receives credit for the song, Dickinson states that he made a "moral contribution" to the song, in addition to "Children of the Damned" and "The Prisoner" from the same album. While speaking at the IBM Smarter Business conference in Stockholm on 10 October 2012, Dickinson revealed that parts of the song are based on the "rising sixth" interval within a scale, inspired by a documentary he watched which explored why "My Way" was one of the most popular recorded songs.

Themes 
The song documents the colonization of the Americas, first by Europeans and then by Americans, from the perspective of a Cree Indian and American cavalryman. The opening verse is from the perspective of the Cree, describing his troubles as the European Americans "came across the sea", bringing the Cree "pain and misery". The song is written from both perspectives, The second verse is from the perspective of a U.S. cavalry soldier, describing his involvement in the American Indian Wars, "chasing the redskins back to their holes". The third verse is not from the perspective of any single individual, and harshly condemns the effects of American expansionism on Native Americans, resulting in the "[Americans] raping the women and wasting the men", and "enslaving the young and destroying the old".

Original 1982 release 
The song was released as a single on 12 February 1982; more than 5 weeks prior to the album's release on 22 March 1982. The single marked Iron Maiden's debut release with new vocalist Bruce Dickinson. "Total Eclipse" was selected as the single's B-side over the song "Gangland", which in turn would appear on the initial version of the album. The band later regretted this decision, with Steve Harris commenting, "We chose the wrong track as the B-side. I think if "Total Eclipse" had been on the album instead of "Gangland", it would have been far better." The song was added to The Number of the Beast album when it was remastered in 1998, and was also included in the original Japanese version.

It is the second of three single covers featuring Derek Riggs' depiction of Satan, which debuted on "Purgatory" and later appeared on "The Number of the Beast" covers. According to Riggs, the idea behind the original "Run to the Hills" cover was based around the idea of a "power struggle in hell", in which the band's mascot, Eddie, battles Satan with a tomahawk (referencing the song's subject matter).

As of 2017 the single has sold more than 200,000 copies in UK and has been certified Silver by BPI, the first to do so.

Other releases 
In 1985, a live version of "Run to the Hills", taken from Live After Death, was released as the band's thirteenth single, along with live versions of "Phantom of the Opera" and "Losfer Words (Big 'Orra)" as its B-sides. According to Riggs, he was asked to paint a cover illustration for both "Run to the Hills" and "Phantom of the Opera" and so the artwork depicts Eddie as the phantom in a hilly landscape.

Following former drummer Clive Burr's announcement that he was suffering from multiple sclerosis, "Run to the Hills" was released again in 2002 to raise money for the newly established Clive Burr MS Trust Fund. Two variations were issued, the original studio version and a live version taken from the Rock in Rio concert, with different B-sides.

Appearances in media
An all-star cover version of the song is found on the 2005 tribute album Numbers from the Beast, featuring Robin McAuley on vocals, Michael Schenker and Pete Fletcher on guitars, Tony Franklin on bass and Brian Tichy (Derek Sherinian, B'z) on drums. The all-female tribute band The Iron Maidens recorded the song on their 2005 debut album, World's Only Female Tribute to Iron Maiden. Former Babes in Toyland singer and guitarist Kat Bjelland's Katastrophy Wife covered the song in their Heart On EP in 2007. The song was covered in 2008 by Sign on the tribute CD Maiden Heaven: A Tribute to Iron Maiden released by Kerrang! magazine. The Swedish lounge metal band Hellsongs included a cover version on their 2008 album Hymns in the Key of 666. In 2009, the eventual Swedish Idol 2009 series winner Erik Grönwall sang it during the live shows and released it as a single in the same year, which peaked at No. 23 in the Swedish Singles Chart. Progressive metal band Dream Theater covered the song live, along with the entire The Number of the Beast album, and released it as an "official bootleg" in 2006.

The song is also featured in the soundtracks of several video games, including SSX on Tour (2005) as the title's main theme, and Grand Theft Auto: The Lost and Damned (2009). In addition, a cover version is featured in Rock Band (2007), in which it received an "Impossible" difficulty rating, while the original version was made available via download in June 2009.

Video
The official video features fight scenes from the 1923 silent movie The Uncovered Wagon, a parody on the movie The Covered Wagon, also from 1923.

Track listing
7" single

1985 7" Live single

1985 12" Live single

2002 7" Red Vinyl single

2002 Enhanced CD Part. I

2002 Enhanced CD Part. II

2002 Enhanced CD European Edition

Personnel

1982 studio single
Production credits are adapted from the 7-inch vinyl cover.
 Bruce Dickinson – lead vocals
 Dave Murray – lead guitar
 Adrian Smith – rhythm guitar, backing vocals
 Steve Harris – bass, backing vocals
 Clive Burr – drums
Production
Martin Birch – producer, engineer
Derek Riggs – cover illustration
Ross Halfin – photography

1985 live single
Production credits are adapted from the 7-inch vinyl, and 12-inch vinyl covers.
Iron Maiden
 Bruce Dickinson – lead vocals
 Steve Harris – bass, backing vocals
 Dave Murray – lead guitar
 Adrian Smith – rhythm guitar, backing vocals
 Nicko McBrain – drums
Production
Martin Birch – producer, engineer, mixing
Derek Riggs – cover illustration

2002 studio / live single
 Bruce Dickinson – lead vocals
 Dave Murray – lead guitar
 Adrian Smith – rhythm guitar, backing vocals
 Janick Gers – rhythm guitar
 Steve Harris – bass, backing vocals
 Nicko McBrain – drums

Charts

Run to the Hills

Run to the Hills (Live)

Run to the Hills/The Number of the Beast

Running Free (Live) / Run to the Hills (Live)

Run to the Hills

Certifications

See also
List of anti-war songs

References

1982 singles
1982 songs
1985 singles
2002 singles
Anti-imperialism
EMI Records singles
Iron Maiden songs
Protest songs
Songs about Native Americans
Songs written by Steve Harris (musician)